The linea alba (Latin for white line), in dentistry, is a horizontal streak on the buccal mucosa (inner surface of the cheek), level with the occlusion (biting plane). It usually extends from the commissure to the posterior teeth, and can extend to the inner lip mucosa and corners of the mouth.

The linea alba is a common finding and most likely associated with pressure, frictional irritation, or sucking trauma from the facial surfaces of the teeth. It may be mistaken for a lesion requiring treatment and may be found in individuals who chew tobacco.

Clinical considerations
The linea alba is usually present bilaterally
It is restricted to dentulous areas (i.e., in areas where there are missing teeth the line will be absent - unless a denture is worn)
It presents an asymptomatic, linear elevation, with a whitish colour, at the level of the occlusal line of the teeth

Treatment
Treatment is not required.

See also 
 Crenated tongue
 Morsicatio buccarum
 Linea alba (abdomen)

References

External links
Image

Conditions of the mucous membranes